Pesend Hanım ("lovely"; born Princess Fatma Kadriye Achba;  13 February 1876 – 5 November 1924) was a consort of Sultan Abdul Hamid II of the Ottoman Empire.

Early life
Fatma Pesend Hanım was born on 13 February 1876 in Achba Mansion, Horhor, Istanbul. Born as Fatma Kadriye Hanim Achba, she was a member of Abkhazian princely family Achba. Her father was Prince Ahmed Sami Bey (1839 – 1915), the son of Prince Ahmed Bey and Patıma Hanım Eşba. Her mother was Princess Fatıma Hanım Ismailevna Mamleeva (1844 – 1923), the daughter of Tatar prince Ismail Bey Mamleeva and a Giray princess. She had an elder sister Princess Ayşe Mahizer Hanım (1871 – 1948), and a younger brother Prince Şükrü Bey (1878 – 1940). Her nephew was Leyla Achba. She was a painter and piano player by avocation. She also spoke French and Italian, and enjoyed horseback riding, especially with Arabian horses. She had a very extensive knowledge and loved to read books. She was beautiful, tall and curvy with blue eyes and long curly brown hair.

Marriage
Fatma's father Sami Bey was in service to Sultan Abdulaziz's eldest son Şehzade Yusuf Izzeddin, and later to Abdul Hamid's eldest son Şehzade Mehmed Selim. His consort, Fatıma Hanım, was once invited by Şehzade Selim’s mother Bedrifelek Kadınefendi, and she decided to bring her two daughters with her.

When they arrived to Yıldız Palace, they got out of their carriage and walked to the residence of the Imperial Consort, passing through the private residence of the sultan. Abdülhamid II was at the window and saw them arriving. Princess Fatma stopped walking and observed him, asking who that man was. The kalfas looked around and when they saw their master, exclaimed: "Dear Lord, that is the sultan!” Princess Fatma graciously bowed to him and continued on her way.

That act greatly pleased Abdülhamid II, who sent for the High Hazinedar and asked who that young girl was. Finally, he learned that it was the daughter of Sami Bey, in service to his son Selim Efendi. A few days passed, then the sultan called Sami Bey to ask him about Princess Fatma. 

Abdul Hamid asked her hand in marriage from her father. He consented to Abdul Hamid's proposal, and the marriage took place on 20 July 1896 at the Yıldız Palace. She was given the name "Fatma Pesend Hanim", and the title of "Fourth Ikbal". On 10 July 1897, a year after the marriage, she gave birth to her only child, a daughter Hatice Sultan, who lived only eight months and died because ill.

Hatice's early death in 1898 prompted Abdul Hamid to order the construction of a modern hospital in Istanbul exclusively for the treatment of children and pregnant women. The construction of the hospital started on 12 May 1898 and was completed on 5 June 1899. It was called "Hamidiye Etfal Hastahane-i Âlisi", and was completely Abdul Hamid's creation and totally under his supervision. Pesend would visit it every week and paid particular attention to the conditions of orphaned children. She also provided financial assistance to less privileged families, and once she even took off one of her necklaces and gave it to a poor woman.

Fatma Pesend was one of the most beloved Abdülhamid's consorts, with Müşfika Kadın and Saliha Naciye Kadın. Abdülhamid was especially fond and proud of her, and also trusted her greatly. She had a good reputation in the palace, and influence as well; outside, she was well known among the people for her good heart and good looks. 

Ayşe Sultan, her step-daughter, notes in her memoirs that whenever Dilber Cenan Hanım, Abdul Hamid's wetnurse, visited the palace, she would stay as a guest in Fatma Pesend's household.

On 27 April 1909, Abdul Hamid was deposed, and sent into exile in Thessaloniki. Fatma Pesend was closed to Abdul Hamid, and so accompanied him to exile. However, in 1910, a year later, she returned to Istanbul. She would not see him again. After Thessaloniki fell to Greece in 1912, Abdul Hamid also returned to Istanbul, and settled in the Beylerbeyi Palace, where he died in 1918. In Istanbul, she lived with her father but she just could not forget her husband so, when he was brought back after the Greeks had taken Thessaloniki, she petitioned for various times to be allowed to live in Beylerbeyi Palace with him, but she never received permission. When Abdülhamid II died in 1918, she cut her hair off and threw them into the sea as a sign of mourning.

Last years and death
At the exile of the imperial family in March 1924, Fatma Pesend remained in Istanbul and she lived an humble life. She died in her villa at Vaniköy, on 5 November 1924, and was buried at Karacaahmet Cemetery at Üsküdar, with her mother.

Issue

In popular culture
In the 2003 film Abdülhamid Düşerken, Fatma Pesend Hanım is portrayed by Turkish actress Mihrace Yeken.
In the 2017 TV series Payitaht: Abdülhamid, Fatma Pesend Hanım is portrayed by Turkish actress Zeynep Özder.

Ancestry

See also
Ikbal (title)
Ottoman Imperial Harem
List of consorts of the Ottoman sultans

References

Sources

19th-century consorts of Ottoman sultans
1928 deaths
People from the Ottoman Empire of Abkhazian descent
Abdul Hamid II
20th-century consorts of Ottoman sultans